Lebrunia  may refer to:
 Lebrunia (animal), a genus of sea anemones 
 Lebrunia (plant), a monotypic plant genus comprising the species Lebrunia bushaie